Sterling Jarvis is a Canadian actor and singer. Originally from Nova Scotia, he currently lives in Toronto, Ontario.

He won a Dora Mavor Moore Award in 2012 for Outstanding Performance by a Male (Musical) for his performance in Caroline, or Change. He has also appeared on stage in productions of We Will Rock You, Of Mice and Men, The Lion King, Bruce Norris' Clybourne Park, Matthew Lopez's The Whipping Man and Lynn Nottage's Ruined, for which he garnered a Dora nomination in 2011 for Outstanding Performance by a Male in a Principal Role – Play.

On television he has had guest roles in Undergrads, The West Wing, The Eleventh Hour, 'Til Death Do Us Part, The Border, The Bridge, InSecurity, Warehouse 13, Covert Affairs, Suits, Lost Girl, Nikita, and Degrassi: Next Class.

Jarvis has also been an R&B songwriter and performer. With the group Spunkadelic, he cowrote the Juno Award-nominated 1990 single "Take Me Like I Am". He released a single, "Alone With You", on Canopy Records in 2011, and recorded the theme music for the television series Zoboomafoo.

Jarvis also provided the singing voice for Donkey Kong in Donkey Kong Country and for Ian Jones-Quartey's character Radicles in his Cartoon Network series, OK K.O.! Let's Be Heroes episode "Rad Likes Robots".

Filmography

References

External links
Sterling Jarvis

Canadian male television actors
Canadian male film actors
Canadian male voice actors
Canadian male stage actors
Canadian male musical theatre actors
20th-century Black Canadian male singers
Canadian contemporary R&B singers
Place of birth missing (living people)
Year of birth missing (living people)
Black Canadian male actors
21st-century Black Canadian male singers
Black Nova Scotians
Dora Mavor Moore Award winners
Living people
Male actors from Nova Scotia
Musicians from Nova Scotia
People from Digby County, Nova Scotia
Canadian people of African-American descent